This is a complete list of the stage works of the Venezuelan, naturalised French, composer Reynaldo Hahn (1874–1947).


List

References
O'Connor, Patrick (1992), "Hahn, Reynaldo" in The New Grove Dictionary of Opera, ed. Stanley Sadie (London)

External links
Musicologie.org Musicologie biography
Lycos.fr page on Hahn
Operone page

Lists of operas by composer
 
Lists of compositions by composer